Basilina (died 332/333) was the wife of Julius Constantius and the mother of the Roman emperor Julian (r. 361–363) who in her honour gave the name Basilinopolis to a city in Bithynia (modern Pazarköy near Gemlik, in Turkey).

Biography
Basilina was of Greek descent born in Asia Minor. She was the daughter of Caeionius Iulianus Camenius, or more likely of Julius Julianus, and received a classical education (i.e., Homer and Hesiod) from Mardonius, a eunuch who grew up in the house of her father. She became the second wife of Julius Constantius, whom she gave Julian; Basilina died a few months after childbirth; her sister was the mother of Procopius.

A Christian, Basilina initially favoured the Arians, but gave her lands as an inheritance to the church of Ephesus. She was a relative of Bishop Eusebius of Nicomedia, her son's tutor.

References

Citations

Sources

332 deaths
333 deaths
4th-century Christians
4th-century Greek women
4th-century Roman women
Constantinian dynasty
Year of birth unknown
Julian (emperor)